Hornberg is a town in the Ortenaukreis, in western Baden-Württemberg, Germany. It is situated in the Black Forest, 35 km southeast of Offenburg, and 25 km northwest of Villingen-Schwenningen.

Local activities 
Hornberg is the location of the Duravit Design Center. The center has a viewing platform designed by Philippe Starck. This viewing platform is arguably the largest toilet bowl in the world. Duravit also has a production facility in Hornberg.

The family brewery M. Ketterer GmbH & Co.KG is also located in Hornberg.

Black Forest Railway (German: Schwarzwaldbahn) 
Hornberg has a railway station on the Black Forest Railway. The route the railway takes to Sankt Georgen im Schwarzwald is considered one of the most spectacular parts of the route.

Sons and daughters of the town
   (born 1948), physician (head of the radiology department of the hospital Konstanz), theologian and writer
 Wilhelm Hausenstein (1882–1957), writer, art critic and cultural historian, journalist and diplomat
Friedrich Jeckeln (1895–1946), Nazi SS officer and Police Leader executed for war crimes
 Thomas Schäuble (1948–2013), German politician (CDU), Director of the Baden State Brewery Rothaus, brother of Wolfgang Schäuble

Personalities who were active in Hornberg

 Rochus Misch (1917–2013), bodyguard and telephone operator for Adolf Hitler; had a business for painters in Hornberg before the war
 Wolfgang Schäuble (born 1942), German politician (CDU), grew up in Hornberg
 Reinold of Urslingen (around 1364-1442), Knight, 1437 share ownership of the castle and city Hornberg

References

External links
  Information about and images
 Hornberg on the Schwarzwald Portal (Black Forest Portal), a tourist website

Ortenaukreis
Baden